Șuteu is a Romanian surname. Notable people with the surname include:

Aurel Şuteu (born 1957), Romanian wrestler
Corina Șuteu (born 1961), Romanian consultant and politician 

Romanian-language surnames